The Runt domain  is an evolutionary conserved protein domain.
   
The AML1/RUNX1 gene is rearranged by the t(8;21) translocation in acute myeloid leukemia. The gene is highly similar to the Drosophila melanogaster segmentation gene runt and to the mouse transcription factor PEBP2 alpha subunit gene. The region of shared similarity, known as the Runt domain, is responsible for DNA-binding and protein-protein interaction.

In addition to the highly conserved Runt domain, the AML-1 gene product carries a putative ATP-binding site (GRSGRGKS), and has a C-terminal region rich in proline and serine residues. The protein (known as acute myeloid leukemia 1 protein, oncogene AML-1, core-binding factor (CBF), alpha-B subunit, etc.) binds to the core site, 5'-pygpyggt-3', of a number of enhancers and promoters.

The protein is a heterodimer of alpha- and beta-subunits. The alpha-subunit binds DNA as a monomer, and appears to have a role in the development of normal hematopoiesis. CBF is a nuclear protein expressed in numerous tissue types, except brain and heart; highest levels have been found to occur in thymus, bone marrow and peripheral blood.

This domain occurs towards the N-terminus of the proteins in this entry.

Examples 

Human genes encoding proteins containing this domain include:
 RUNX1, RUNX2, RUNX3

See also 
 Pair-rule gene - for runt gene in Drosophila melanogaster

References

Protein domains